Ruzza is a surname. Notable people with the surname include:

 Bruno Ruzza (1926–2019), Italian footballer
 Federico Ruzza (born 1994), Italian rugby player
 Iliana Ruzza, Venezuelan public official 
 Sandra Oblitas Ruzza (born 1969), Venezuelan public official